Dynamine postverta, the Mylitta greenwing or  four-spot sailor, is a butterfly in the family Nymphalidae. It is found throughout most tropical and subtropical areas of Central and South America, from Mexico south to Argentina and Paraguay. The habitat includes primary rainforests, humid deciduous woodlands, scrubby grassland and farmland at altitudes up to about 900 metres.

The larvae feed on Dalechampia species. They are slug like, with tiny rosettes of spines on the back.

Subspecies
The following subspecies are recognised:
D. p. postverta (Surinam, Brazil: Bahia, Minas Gerais)
D. p. mexicana d'Almeida, 1952 (Mexico, Honduras)

References

 , 1780, Uitl. Kapellen 3 (22), pl.254, f. C,D.
 , 2004, Atlas of Neotropical Lepidoptera; Checklist:Part 4A; Hesperioidea-Papilionoidea.

Biblidinae
Butterflies of Central America
Butterflies of the Caribbean
Nymphalidae of South America
Butterflies of Cuba
Butterflies of North America
Lepidoptera of Brazil
Lepidoptera of Ecuador
Lepidoptera of Venezuela
Fauna of the Amazon
Butterflies described in 1780